R. celebensis may refer to:

Rhinolophus celebensis, the Sulawesi horseshoe bat, a bat species
Roepkiella celebensis, a moth species
Rousettus celebensis, the Sulawesi rousette, a bat species